Soy Diferente (I'm Different) is India's eighth studio album released in February 2006, under record label SGZ Entertainment/Univision Music Group. Under the production of Sergio George and Isidro Infante, India sets herself as composer of all of the songs. On the album, she collaborates with Cheka, Ivy Queen, Tito Nieves and her mother, in the song "Madre e Hija" ("Mother and Daughter").

Track listing
Standard Edition:

Chart performance

Sales and certifications

See also
List of number-one Billboard Tropical Albums from the 2000s

References

2006 albums
La India albums
Albums produced by Sergio George